Hedzranawo is a town located in the Volta Region of Ghana between Denu and Adafienu.

References 

Populated places in the Volta Region